The Independence Decoration was a Rhodesian civil decoration awarded to persons who played a notable and significant part in the Unilateral Declaration of Independence in 1965.

Institution 
The award was instituted in 1970 by Presidential Warrant, the first awards being made the same year.

Medal 
The medal was a sterling silver circular medal worn on the breast. The obverse bore the arms of Rhodesia and the legend RHODESIA INDEPENDENCE ELEVENTH NOVEMBER 1965, while the reverse was blank. The medal was impressed in small capitals with the recipient's name on the rim, and was awarded with a case of issue, miniature medal for wear, and an illuminated certificate. The ribbon consisted of five equal stripes, green, white, gold, white, green. When the ribbon alone was worn, it bore a green rosette to distinguish it from the Independence Commemorative Decoration.

Recipients
29 awards of the Independence Decoration were made between 1970 and 1979. Twenty-eight awards were made in November 1970 to Rhodesian Front politicians including P. K. van der Byl, Des Lardner-Burke and the other ten signatories of the Unilateral Declaration of Independence. No further medals were given out until April 1979, when an award was made to Ken Flower, the Head of the Rhodesian Central Intelligence Organization.

Recipients were entitled to the post-nominal letters: ID.

Zimbabwe
The Independence Decoration fell into abeyance following Zimbabwe Rhodesia's adoption of majority rule in 1979, and the country's transformation into Zimbabwe a year later.

References

Saffery, D., 2006. The Rhodesia Medal Roll, Jeppestown Press, United Kingdom,

External links
 Orders, Medals and Decorations of Zimbabwe

Orders, decorations, and medals of Rhodesia